Paul Francis "Racket" Coppo (November 2, 1938 – June 2, 2022) was an American ice hockey player. He was a member of the United States's 1964 Winter Olympics team.  He would go on to play with the Green Bay Bobcats of the United States Hockey League.  He was inducted into the United States Hockey Hall of Fame in 2004.

Awards and honors

References

External links
 United States Hockey Hall of Fame bio
 

1938 births
2022 deaths
Green Bay Bobcats players
Ice hockey players from Michigan
Michigan Tech Huskies men's ice hockey players
People from Hancock, Michigan
United States Hockey Hall of Fame inductees
Olympic ice hockey players of the United States
Ice hockey players at the 1964 Winter Olympics
American men's ice hockey centers
AHCA Division I men's ice hockey All-Americans